Auchincloss is a surname of Scottish origin, derived from an area in Ayrshire known as Auchincloich, which is Scottish Gaelic for "field of stones". It is also the name of a prominent American family with kinship to the Kennedy family, 

Notables
Notable people with the surname include:

 Hugh D. Auchincloss (1897–1976), American stockbroker, lawyer, and stepfather of former First Lady of the United States Jacqueline Kennedy Onassis (through Janet Lee Bouvier), husband of John F. Kennedy
Hugh Auchincloss, American immunologist and physician-scientist
 Jake Auchincloss (born 1988), American politician
 James C. Auchincloss (1885–1976), American businessman and politician
 Lily Auchincloss (1922–2008), American journalist, philanthropist, and art collector
 Louis Auchincloss (1917–2010), American lawyer, novelist, historian, and essayist

Family tree

John L. Auchincloss (1810–1876), ∞ Elizabeth Buck (1816–1902)
Henry Buck Auchincloss (1836–1926), ∞ Mary Cabell (1837–1903)
Margaret Cabell Auchincloss (1861–1935), ∞ Richard Morse Colgate (1854–1919)
Henry Stuart Auchincloss (1863–1863)
Elizabeth Belden Auchincloss (1869–1876)
John Auchincloss (1872–1948), ∞ Grace Eginton (1883–1965)
James Cabell Auchincloss (1876–1882)
Sarah Ann Auchincloss (1838–1887), ∞ James Coats, 1st Baronet (1834–1913)
Stuart Auchincloss Coats, 2nd Baronet (1868–1959), ∞ 1891: Jane Muir Greenlees
James Stuart Coats, 3rd Baronet (1894–1966)
Alastair Francis Stuart Coats, 4th Baronet (1921–2015)
Alexander James Coats, 5th Baronet (b. 1951)
Edgar Stirling Auchincloss (1847–1892), ∞ Maria LeGrange Sloan (1847–1929)
Samuel Sloan Auchincloss (1873–1934), ∞ Ann Stavely "Annie" Agnew (1873–1905), ∞ Emma Guidet Duryee (1870–1953)
 Samuel Sloan Auchincloss Jr. (1903–1991) ∞ 1939: Lydia Knight Garrison (1908–2009)
Edgar Stirling Auchincloss Jr. (1874–1910), ∞ Marie Louise Mott (1874-1899), ∞ Catherine Stanford Agnew (1875–1967)
Mary Bliss Auchincloss (1904-1982), ∞ Nelson Lawrence Page (1904-1972)
Catherine Agnew Page (1938-2018)
Elizabeth Ellen Auchincloss (1905-1999), ∞ Gordon McLean Tiffany (1912-1999)
Jean Tiffany
William Tiffany
Katrina Sanford Auchincloss (1907-1991), ∞ Royal Elting Mygatt (1907-1948)
Samuel G. Mygatt (1943-2010)
Joseph Mygatt
Peter Mygatt
Elizabeth Mygatt
Edgar Stirling Auchincloss III (1909-2000), ∞ Patty Milburn (1910-1986)
Edgar Stirling Auchincloss IV (b. 1933)
George Milburn Auchincloss (b. 1935)
Patty Milburn Auchincloss (1939-2007)
Elizabeth Ellen Auchincloss (1943-2015)
Elizabeth Ellen Auchincloss (1877–1904)
Hugh Auchincloss (1878–1947), ∞ Frances Coverdale Newlands (1878–1960)
Maria Sloan Auchincloss (1910-2000), ∞ Allen MacMartin Look (1902-1977)
Barbara Ann Look (1936-2009)
Maria Sloan Look (1940-1999), ∞ Howard Stanley Hart II (1929-2010)
Maria Sloan Hart (b.1971)
Maxwell Stanley Hart (b.1972), ∞ Melissa Jane Carelli (b. 1981)
Hazel Jane Hart (b.2012)
Beatrix Sloan Hart (b.2016)
Samuel Allen Hart (b.1977), ∞ Laura Jen McQueen 
Alexander Stanley Hart (b.2019)
Hugh Auchincloss Jr. (1915-1998), ∞ Katharine Lawrence Bundy (1923-2014)
Katharine Lawrence Auchincloss (b. 1943), ∞ (1) David Victor (b. 1942), divorced, ∞ (2) John Kent Corbin (b. 1943)
David Gardiner Victor (b. 1965)
Katharine Lawrence Victor (b. 1967)
Andrew Auchincloss Victor (b. 1970), ∞ (1) Mary Trevlyn Knight (b. 1970), divorced, ∞ (2) Vickie Lynn Pederson (b. 1970)
Jacob Tyler Victor (b. 1998) (with Knight)
Jackson Pederson Victor (b. 2005) (with Pederson)
Margaret Elmendorf Auchincloss (b. 1946), ∞ (1) William John Rademaekers (b. 1930), divorced, ∞ (2) Ian Charles Strachan (b. 1943)
Jonathan Auchincloss Rademaekers (b. 1971)
Charlotte Elisabeth Rademaekers (b. 1974), ∞ Daniel Patrick Binns (b. 1966)
Sebastian Cassady Jonathan Binns (b. 2009)
Hugh Auchincloss III (b. 1949), ∞ Laurie Glimcher (b. 1951), divorced
Clara Elizabeth "Kalah" Auchincloss (b. 1979)
Hugh Glimcher Auchincloss (b. 1982)
Jacob Daniel Auchincloss (b. 1988), ∞ Michelle ?
Teddy Auchincloss (b. 2020)
Elizabeth Lowell Auchincloss (b. 1951), ∞ Richard William Weiss (b. 1944)
Anna Katharine Weiss (b. 1979)
Margaret Elizabeth Weiss (b. 1985)
Charles Crook(e) Auchincloss (1881-1961), ∞ Rosamund Saltonstall (1881-1953)
Rosamund Saltonstall Auchincloss (1907-1971), ∞ (1) Burton James Lee Jr., ∞ (2) Benjamin Carlton Betner Jr. (1908-1970), divorced, ∞ (3) Thomas Campbell Plowden-Wardlaw (1908-1997)
Richard Saltonstall Auchincloss (1909-1990), ∞ Mary King Wainwright (1911-2008)
Charles Crooke Auchincloss II (1940-1984)
Charles Crooke Auchincloss III
Eugenia Wainwright Auchincloss, ∞ John Larrimore
Gavin Charles Larrimore
Richard Saltonstall Auchincloss Jr. (b. 1941), ∞ (1) Marilyn Kendall Crill (1937-1983), ∞ (2) Mary Rogers
Richard Saltonstall Auchincloss III
Mary Gladys King Auchincloss
Thomas Frazer Dixon Auchincloss (b. (1944)
Josephine Lee Auchincloss (1912-2005), ∞ (1) Benjamin Carlton Betner Jr. (1908-1970, divorced, ∞ Harry Ingersoll Nicholas III (1908-1984)
Josephine Lee Betner (1933-1983), ∞ Alexander Dunn Mallace (1929-2018)
Cynthia Ballard Betner (1941-1988), ∞ Simon David Manonian (b. 1944)
Jacques Manonian (1967-1999)
James Coats Auchincloss (1885–1976), ∞ 1909: Lee Frances Alexander (1888-1959), ∞ Vera Rogers Brown
James Douglas Auchincloss (1913–2000), ∞ 1934 (div): Eleanor Grant (1914-1992), ∞ 1956 (div 1979): Lily van Ameringen (1922–1996), ∞ Catherine Manning Hannon (1927-2017)
Kenneth Auchincloss (1937–2003), ∞ Eleanor Johnson
David Auchincloss (b. 1943), ∞ 1966 (div) Robin Gorham
Conrad McIntire Auchincloss (b. 1968)
Hilary Miller Auchincloss (b. 1970), °° 1999 Christopher John Wittmann
Gail Auchincloss, ∞ 1959: Seymour Parker Gilbert III (1933–2015)
Seymour Parker Gilbert IV
Lynn Gilbert Tudor
David Gilbert (b. 1967)
Lee Auchincloss, ∞ 1971: Troland S. Link
Alexandra Auchincloss, ∞ 1987: Paul Karel Herzan
Gordon Auchincloss (d. 1998)
Gordon Auchincloss (1886–1943), ∞ Janet House (1887-1977)
Louise Auchincloss (1914-1974), ∞ (1) Edward Hutchinson Robbins (1912-1944), ∞ (2) Allston Boyer (1912-1972)
Janet Robbins (1934-1941)
Gordon Auchincloss Robbins (1942-2015)
Edward Hutchinson Robbins Jr. (b. 1943)
Edward House Auchincloss (1929-2015), ∞ Justine Allen Eaton (b. 1933)
Reginald LaGrange Auchincloss Sr. (1891–1984), ∞ Ruth Hunter Cutting (1895–1948)
Reginald LaGrange Auchincloss Jr. (1917–1992), ∞ (1) Esther Mackenzie Willcox (1921-2010), divorced, ∞ (2) June Dayton Finn (1930-2015), divorced, ∞ (3) Frances D'Arcy (b. 1939)
Eve LaGrange Auchincloss (b. 1945) (with Willcox), ∞ William Lilley III (b. 1938)
Sandra Cutting Auchincloss (1947-1991), ∞ Eliot Wadsworth II (b. 1942)
Eliot Auchincloss Wadsworth (b. 1977) ∞ Helen Shu 
Natalie Hart Wadsworth (b. 1983)
Eve Auchincloss Wadsworth (b. 1980), ∞ Peter Rueff Lehrman
Reginald LaGrange Auchincloss III (b. 1971) (with D'Arcy)
Ruth Cutting Auchincloss (with D'Arcy), ∞ Charles O'Neill
Frances Catherine Cutting O'Neill (1998-2017)
Ruth Auchincloss (1918-2001), ∞ Edward A. J. Collard
David Collard
Louise Collard
Peter Collard
Bayard Cutting Auchincloss (1922–2001), ∞ (1) Mary Christy Tiffany Pratt (1930-1981) in 1950, ∞ (2) Harriet Ann Murphy (1928–2010) in 1961
Bayard Cutting Auchincloss Jr. (1952-2019)
James Gordon Auchincloss (b. (1954), ∞ Kristin Morris Delafield
Jack T. Auchincloss (b. 1955), ∞ Melodee Basinger (b. 1965)
John C. Auchincloss (b. 2003)
Samantha G. Auchincloss (b. 2006)
Pamela Pratt Auchincloss (b. 1956), ∞ (1) Garner Handy Tullis, divorced, ∞ (2) Steven Henry Madoff
Lucian Auchincloss Madoff
Sloan Pratt Madoff
Susan Sloan Auchincloss (1966–1967)
Samuel H. Auchincloss (b. 1968)
Linda C. Auchincloss (b. 1970)
Lisa Auchincloss (1924–2006), ∞ George Alexander Eyer Jr. (1913-2003)
Diana Eyer (b. 1947)
Lisa Gordon Eyer (b. 1949)
Alexandra Eyer (b. 1951)
Hope Auchincloss (b. 1929), ∞ George Amiel Whipple II (1929-2005)
Jack Van Horn Whipple II (b. 1951)
George Amiel Whipple III
Susan Whipple
John Winthrop Auchincloss (1853–1938), ∞ Joanna Hone Russell (1856–1930)
Charles Russell Auchincloss (1881-1958) ∞ Helen Pickering Rogers (1882-1966)
Mary Elizabeth Auchincloss (1884-1963) ∞ Percy Hall Jennings (1881-1951)
Percy Hall Jennings Jr. (1907-1990) ∞ (1) Thelma Jean Lovett (1906-1994), divorced, ∞ Loretta Arlene Melton (1914-1998), divorced
Mary Jennings (b. 1941)
Nancy Jennings (1941-1941)
John Howland Jennings (b. 1951)
Philip Burton Jennings (1951-2005)
Charles Russell Jennings (b. 1953)
David Hall Jennings (1956-1983)
Joanna Russell Jennings (1908-1996), ∞ David Rodney Hadden (1905-1997)
David Rodney Hadden Jr. (1936-2014)
John Winthrop Hadden (1939-2013)
Robert Malcolm Hadden (b. 1942)
Elizabeth Auchincloss Jennings (1912-1997), ∞ (1) Francis Adams Truslow (1906-1951) (her cousin); ∞ (2) John Taylor Howell Jr. (1891-1977)
Francis Adams Truslow Jr. (b. 1938), ∞ Maria Lowell Gallagher (b. 1942)
Anne Gallagher Truslow (b. 1970), ∞ James Richards Harders (b. 1969)
Francis Adams Truslow III (b. 1972)
Frederick Beach Jennings (1916-1980)
Laura Hall Jennings (1918-2011)
John Winthrop Auchincloss Jr. (1886-1888)
Joseph Howland Auchincloss (1886–1968), ∞ Priscilla Stanton Dixon (1888-1972)
Louis Stanton Auchincloss (1917–2010), ∞ 1957: Adele Burden Lawrence (1931–1991)
Andrew Auchincloss
John Auchincloss
Blake Auchincloss
Joseph Howland Auchincloss Jr. (1921-2013), ∞ Sarah Sedgwick Knapp (1919-1997)
 Katherine Hazard Auchincloss
 Sarah Sedgwick Auchincloss
 Priscilla Stanton Auchincloss
Elizabeth Dixon Auchincloss (1953-2012)
Hugh Dudley Auchincloss Sr. (1858–1913), ∞ Emma Brewster Jennings (1861–1942)
Esther Judson Auchincloss, (div 1929), ∞ Edmund Witherell Nash, ∞ Norman Biltz (1902–1973)
John Francis Nash (1921–2008), ∞ Mary Elizabeth Gough (d. 2007)
Anita Nash, ∞ 1945: Arthur Murray Dodge, ∞ Harkins
Edmund Witherell Nash Jr.
Sheila Kingman Biltz, ∞ 1952: William Alexander O'Brien III
Esther Auchincloss Biltz, ∞ 1953: Paul D. Langham
Ann Burr Auchincloss
Hugh D. Auchincloss (1897–1976), ∞ 1925 (div 1932): Maya de Chrapovitsky, ∞ 1935 (div. 1941): Nina S. Gore, ∞ 1942: Janet Lee Bouvier (1907–1989)
Hugh Dudley "Yusha" Auchincloss III (1927–2015) ∞ Alice Emily Lyon (b. 1934)
Cecil Lyon Auchincloss (b. 1959)
Maya Lillalya Auchincloss (b. 1959)
Nina Gore Auchincloss (b. 1937), ∞ 1957 (div 1974): Newton Steers (1917–1993), ∞ 1974 (div 1998): Michael Whitney Straight (1916–2004)
Hugh Auchincloss Steers (1963–1995)
Ivan Steers
Burr Gore Steers, (b. 1965) ∞: Jennifer Bott
Thomas Gore Auchincloss (b. 1937)
Janet Jennings Auchincloss (1945–1985), ∞ 1966: Lewis Polk Rutherfurd (b. 1944)
Lewis Stuyvesant Rutherfurd (b. 1968)
Andrew Hugh Auchincloss Rutherfurd (b. 1972)
Alexandra Rutherfurd
James Lee Auchincloss (b. 1947)
William Stuart Auchincloss (1842–1928), ∞ Martha Tuthill Kent (1841–1923)
James Stuart Auchincloss (1872–1922)
Jane Kent Auchincloss (1875–1949), ∞ Henry Adams Truslow (1874–1937)
James Linklater Truslow III (1901-1971)
Frederick Kent Truslow (1902-1978)
William Auchincloss Truslow (1904-1950)
Francis Adams Truslow (1906-1951), ∞ Elizabeth Auchincloss Jennings (1912-1997) (his cousin)
Francis Adams Truslow Jr. (b. 1938), ∞ Maria Lowell Gallagher (b. 1942)
Anne Gallagher Truslow (b. 1970), ∞ James Richards Harders (b. 1969)
Francis Adams Truslow III (b. 1972)
Elizabeth Auchincloss Truslow (1908-1964)
Martha Tuthill Truslow (1910-1986)
Louise Adams Truslow (1910-1985)
Henry Adams Truslow Jr. (1913-1991)
John Winthrop Truslow (1913-2000)
William Kent Auchincloss (1877–1960)

See also 
 Auchinleck, a name with a similar meaning, but derived from a different word for "stone":  ("slab").
 Agnes Barr Auchencloss (1886 - 1972), medical officer at H.M. Factory Gretna, on the University of Glasgow Roll of Honour.
 Hugh Auchincloss Brown, electrical engineer for advancing the cataclysmic pole shift hypothesis, member of the extended Auchincloss family through his mother, Matilda Auchincloss (1824–1894), sister of John L. Auchincloss (1810–1876), and daughter of the family patriarch Hugh Auchincloss (1780–1855).
 Hugh Auchincloss (disambiguation)

References

Auchincloss family
Scottish surnames
Surnames of Scottish origin
Surnames of British Isles origin